Elm is an album by American jazz pianist and composer Richard Beirach recorded in 1979 and released on the ECM label.

Reception
The Allmusic review by David R. Adler awarded the album 4 stars stating "At the time of its release, Elm represented an emerging new standard for modern piano trio music, and it remains every bit as valid and vital".

Track listing
All compositions by Richard Beirach
 "Sea Priestess" - 11:32
 "Pendulum" - 6:40
 "Ki" - 5:14
 "Snow Leopard" - 12:30
 "Elm" - 6:10

Personnel
Richard Beirach - piano
George Mraz - bass
Jack DeJohnette - drums

References

ECM Records albums
Richie Beirach albums
1979 albums
Albums produced by Manfred Eicher